Millfield is a Tyne and Wear Metro station, serving Sunderland Royal Hospital and the suburb of Millfield, City of Sunderland in Tyne and Wear, England. It joined the network on 31 March 2002, following the opening of the extension from Pelaw to South Hylton.

Original station
The old station opened in June 1853, before being closed, and re-sited to the north west of Hylton Road in around 1890. The second station closed in May 1955, ahead of the closure of other nearby stations, with Pallion and Hylton closing in May 1964, following the Beeching Axe. Goods facilities remained at Millfield until the late 1970s.

Metro era
Between Millfield and Pallion, it was necessary for the Tyne and Wear Metro route to deviate from the original alignment, owing to the construction of a road. A new trackbed was cut in to a steep slope, and extensively retained with piling, along with the construction of a new road bridge.

Along with other stations on the line between Fellgate and South Hylton, the station is fitted with vitreous enamel panels designed by artist, Morag Morrison. Each station uses a different arrangement of colours, with strong colours used in platform shelters and ticketing areas, and a more neutral palate for external elements.

The station was used by 203,654 passengers in 2017–18, making it the third-least-used station on the Wearside extension, after Pallion (92,060) and St. Peter's (107,887).

Facilities 
Step-free access is available at all stations across the Tyne and Wear Metro network, with ramped access to both platforms at Millfield. The station is equipped with ticket machines, waiting shelter, seating, next train information displays, timetable posters, and an emergency help point on both platforms. Ticket machines are able to accept payment with credit and debit card (including contactless payment), notes and coins. The station is also fitted with smartcard validators, which feature at all stations across the network.

There is car parking available, with 12 on-street parking bays located off Hylton Road, as well as two accessible parking spaces. There is also the provision for cycle parking, with four cycle pods available for use.

Services 
, the station is served by up to five trains per hour on weekdays and Saturday, and up to four trains per hour during the evening and on Sunday.

Rolling stock used: Class 599 Metrocar

References

External links
 
 Timetable and station information for Millfield

Sunderland
2002 establishments in England
Railway stations in Great Britain opened in 2002
Tyne and Wear Metro Green line stations
Transport in the City of Sunderland
Transport in Tyne and Wear
